School District of Knob Noster R-8 is in Knob Noster, Johnson County, Missouri, USA. The Knob Noster R-8 school district covers the cities and communities of Knob Noster, WAFB, and Montserrat.  As of 2006 the school district had 1,595 students, 168 certified staff members, and 4 schools.

Schools

High schools

 Knob Noster High School holds grades 9-12.

Middle School High

Knob Noster Middle School supports students in grades 6-8. The school is housed in a building that was originally the high school.

Elementary schools 

Knob Noster elementary schools are organized in two categories: Whiteman AFB students and Knob Noster Students.  The Elementary Schools contain grades K-5.

Knob Noster Elementary
Whiteman Elementary

References

External links
 School District of Knob Noster R-VIII

School districts in Missouri
Education in Johnson County, Missouri